Sergey Leonidovich Katanandov is the former leader of the Republic of Karelia, an autonomous entity of Russia, in 1998–2010, first as Prime Minister, then as Head of the Republic.

Katanandov was born in 1955, in the Karelian capital of Petrozavodsk. Educated in civil engineering and law, Katanandov served as Mayor of Petrozavodsk from 1990 to 1998, and became Chairman of the Government of Karelia in 1998. From May 2002 till June 30, 2010, he was the Head of the Republic of Karelia.

Biography 
Katanandov was born to Karelian parents in Petrozavodsk on April 21, 1955. He graduated from the Faculty of industrial and civil construction of Petrozavodsk State University in 1977. After graduation he worked as a foreman at a construction site. This was followed by a foreman, chief of section, chief engineer of SMU-1 Trust "Petrozavodskstroy, chief engineer of the trust, the head of design and construction of large housing associations. Eventually he ended up becoming a popular politician in Russia. In April 2000, was awarded the Order of Honor. Katanandov is married, and has two sons.

External links 
 Government of Karelia - Sergey Katanandov 

1955 births
Living people
People from Petrozavodsk
Mayors of Petrozavodsk
Heads of the Republic of Karelia
United Russia politicians
21st-century Russian politicians
Members of the Federation Council of Russia (after 2000)

Prime Ministers of the Republic of Karelia
Deputies of the Legislative Assembly of the Republic of Karelia